Yuanbei Island or Yuanbei Islet, also transliterated as Inkai Island, is an island in Baisha Township, Penghu County (the Pescadores), Taiwan.

See also
 List of islands of Taiwan

References

Baisha Township
Islands of the South China Sea
Islands of Taiwan
Landforms of Penghu County
Penghu Islands
Taiwan Strait